Dindicodes apicalis is a moth of the family Geometridae first described by Frederic Moore in 1888. It is found in Asia, including India and China.

Subspecies
Dindicodes apicalis apicalis
Dindicodes apicalis hunana (Xue, 1992)

References

Moths described in 1888
Pseudoterpnini